A secret recipe is a recipe whose details are held under secrecy, usually (especially in commercial circumstances) protected by law as a trade secret.

Secret Recipe may also refer to:

 Secret Recipe (restaurant), a lifestyle café chain in Malaysia
 Secret Recipe (Buckethead DVD), a two disc DVD set by musician Buckethead
 Colonel's secret recipe, the trade secret spice mix used by fast food chain KFC in the preparation of their chicken

See also 

 Trade secret